The Daring Years is 1923 American silent melodrama film directed by Kenneth Webb and produced by Daniel Carson Goodman. The film starred Mildred Harris, Clara Bow, Charles Emmett Mack, and Tyrone Power, Sr.

Plot
A university student named John Browning (Charles Emmett Mack) goes against his mother's wishes and becomes involved in a torrid love-affair with a fickle young cabaret singer named Susie LaMotte (Mildred Harris). LaMotte toys with the youth's affections and does not tell him that she is already romantically involved with a boxer named Jim Moran (Joe King).

One evening John Browning discovers that Susie and Moran are having a relationship when he accidentally walks in on them. Outraged, Browning and Moran become embroiled in an argument. Moran pulls out a pistol, but during the ensuing struggle accidentally mortally wounds himself. Overcome with rage, Susie blames John Browning for Moran's death and Browning is subsequently tried, convicted and sentenced to death.

Browning languishes in prison for some time, and just as he is strapped into the electric chair to be executed for the murder of Jim Moran, a bolt of lightning strikes the prison knocking out the power. Meanwhile, Moran's widow (Clara Bow) implores Susie to tell the authorities the truth surrounding the circumstances of the death of Jim Moran. Susie eventually folds and confesses that she had lied and that Jim Moran had in fact accidentally shot himself after pulling a gun on John Browning.

John is pardoned by the governor and leaves prison a free man.

Cast

Preservation
With no prints of The Daring Years located in any film archives, it is a lost film.

See also
List of lost films

References

External links

The Daring Years, AFI Catalog - Silent Films

Still at silenthollywood.com

1923 films
1923 drama films
Silent American drama films
American silent feature films
American black-and-white films
Films directed by Kenneth Webb
Lost American films
Melodrama films
1923 lost films
Lost drama films
1920s American films